Ojārs Raimonds Pauls (born 12 January 1936 in Iļģuciems, Riga, Latvia) is a Latvian composer and a pianist who is well known in Latvia, Russia, post-Soviet countries and worldwide. He was the Minister of Culture of Latvia from 1988 to 1993.

Biography
Raimonds Pauls is the second child of Iļguciems' glass blowing factory worker Voldemārs Pauls and seamstress Alma Matilde Brodele. His father Voldemārs began his career at the age of 15 years, when he joined his father (Raimonds Pauls' grandfather Ādolfs Pauls) at the factory. Meanwhile, Voldemārs' mother Aleksandra, respectively, Raimonds' grandmother, hired an assistant at her shop – Alma. In 1932, Voldemārs and Alma celebrate their wedding. Unfortunately, their firstborn son Gustavs dies from meningitis at the age of four months.

As Raimonds' father has played drums and his grandfather – violin, Voldemārs decides that his son should also play a musical instrument. Equipped with an old violin, Raimonds gets into Riga's institute of Music kindergarten branch. As it was decided by the teachers that he was too young and "his fingers were unfit" for playing violin, Raimonds starts with piano lessons.

In 1943, Raimonds begins his studies at Riga's 7th Elementary school, while, in parallel, continuing to take piano lessons with the professor Valerijs Zosts and teachers Emma Eglīte and Juta Daugule.

In 1946, Raimonds is admitted to the Secondary Musical School of Emīls Dārziņš, combining his studies at the elementary school for three years. At the age of 14, Raimonds gains experience playing piano at restaurants and clubs with a violin and saxophone virtuoso Gunārs Kušķis. In 1949, he finishes his studies at the Riga's 7th Elementary school. During this time, he independently develops a liking for playing jazz by studying and imitating various jazz records.

Honours 

 August 1967 – Celebrated Servant of Art
 June 1976 – Artist of the People's Theatre of LSSR
 January 1985 – Artist of the People's Theatre of USSR
 24 November 1992 – Honorary member of the Latvian Academy of Sciences
1994 – Laureate of the Big Musical Award (for the poetic performance "" ('Every Tree You See By God is Given Thee'), the concert  ('It's Time for Swing') and the CD  ('In Christmas'))
 12 April 1995 – decorated with the Order of the Three Stars (3rd class); thus he is a commander of the Order of the Three Stars (for merits on behalf of the state of Latvia).
2020 – Order of the Rising Sun 3rd Class, Gold Rays with Neck Ribbon (Japan)
Laureate of state and Komsomol awards

Major works

Musicals 
  (Lovers Who Get It) (1976)
  (Sister Carrie) after the Theodore Dreiser novel (1978)
  (Come to the Boys) (1982)
  (A Matter of the Devil) (1987)
  (Forest Swans) (1995)
  (The Legend of the Green Maiden) (2000)

Ballets 
  (Melodies of Cuba) (1963)
  (Rhythms, Rhythms) (1979)
  (Stained Glass Panels) (1979)

Theatre performances 
30 theatre performances, including:

  (A Short Instruction in Love)
  (The Ingenious Nanny)
  (Sherlock Holmes)
  (Brand)
  (John Neiland)
  (Elizabeth – Queen of England)
  (The Count of Monte Cristo)
  (Paradise of Ladies)
  (The Melancholic Waltz)

Puppet shows:

  (The Belly Tomcat)
  (The Two Imps)
  (The Fourth Vertebra)

Films 
Music for more than 30 movies, including:

 The Devil's Servants
 The Devil's Servants at the Devil's Mill
  (The Butterfly Dance)
  (In the Pincers of the Black Lobster)
 Double Trap 
  (A Present for a Lonely Woman)
 My Frivolous Friend
 Theater after the novel by W. Somerset Maugham
 A Limousine the Colour of Midsummer's Eve
 The Mills of Fate, for the Long Road in the Dunes series, etc.

Choir music 
 Three songs for choir and piano (1972)
 Ten arrangements of Latvian folk songs for boys' choir (1980)
 Song cycle with lyrics from Latvian poet Aspazija for boys' choir (1980) 
  (The White Songs) for boys' choir and instrumental ensemble (1981)
 Song cycle for choir and piano (1984)
  (Songs of a Willow Pipe) cycle for boys' choir (1984)
  (A Small and Happy Boy) – ten songs for boys' choir and piano with the lyrics of M. Karēms (1985)
 Cycle  (Pearl Hunter) for boys’ choir and tenor (1986)

Cycles of light music songs 
  (The Stained Glass Panels of the Old Rīga) (1971)
 Five songs with the lyrics of D. Avotiņa (1972)
 Oriental motifs (1982)
 City romance (1983)
  (The Black Cry) (1985)
 Cycle with lyrics by Rainis (1985)

Jazz 

 (Portraits) suite (1962)
 A Rhapsody for piano and light music orchestra (1964)
  (Impressions) suite (1965)
  suite (The Water-Colours of the South) (1965)
  (Mountain Sketches) (1966)
 Five improvisations in the spirit of Latvian folk songs (1967)
  (Black Colours) suite (1967)
 Jazz expressions (1970) and other works

Instrumental music 

 Approximately 300 works, including instrumental versions of songs, arrangements of folk songs, versions on familiar themes, arrangements of classical composer works.
 More than 90 albums with songs and instrumental music (/Daiga Mazvērsīte)
Music for radio performances and plays
Approximately 70 songs for children

Popular songs in Russian
 "Million Roses" ("") by Alla Pugacheva
 "" ("") by Alla Pugacheva
 "Maestro" ("") by Alla Pugacheva
 "" ("") by Alla Pugacheva
 "" ("") by Alla Pugacheva
 "" ("") by Alla Pugacheva
 "" ("") by Alla Pugacheva
 "Zeleni svet" ("") by Valery Leontiev
 "Ischezli Solnechnie Dni" ("") by Valery Leontiev
 "" ("") by Valery Leontiev
 "" ("") by Valery Leontiev
 "" ("") by Valery Leontiev
 "" ("") by Valery Leontiev
 "" ("") by Valery Leontiev
 "" ("") by Valery Leontiev
 "" ("") by Valery Leontiev or Andrei Mironov
 "'" ("") by Valery Leontiev
 "" ("") by Valery Leontiev
 "" ("") by Valery Leontiev and Laima Vaikule
 "" ("") by Laima Vaikule
 "" ("") by Laima Vaikule
 "" ("") by Laima Vaikule
 "" ("") by Laima Vaikule
 "" ("") by Laima Vaikule
 "" ("") by Jaak Joala
 "" ("") by Jaak Joala
 "" ("") by Larisa Mondrus
 "" ("") by Roza Rymbayeva
 "" ("") by Nikolai Gnatyk

Popular songs in Latvian
 "To my Fatherland" ("") by Viktors Lapčenoks (co-composed with Jānis Peters)

Recordings 
 Dialogue, album with Valery Leontiev (1984)
 Velvet season, album with Valery Leontiev (1986)

Politics
Raimonds Pauls was a member of the Supreme Soviet of the Latvian SSR and served as Minister of Culture in the Latvian government from 1988 to 1993. In 1993 he became an advisor to the President of Latvia. In 1998, he was elected a Member of the Saeima, the Latvian parliament, initially as leader of the New Party. Before the 2002 elections he joined the People's Party and was elected on its party list in 2002 and 2006. Pauls ran in the 1999 presidential election and received the highest number of votes, but below the required majority. He chose to decline the post.

In 1996, he went on a tour with singer Laima Vaikule, which included concert locations in Moscow, Saint Petersburg and New York City.

Works
As of 2004, Pauls has composed music for six musical films and musical theaters, three ballets and over 50 movies and theater performances. CDs with Pauls' music have been released in several countries outside Latvia, including Russia, Finland and Japan. In 2006 he recorded a double album of jazz music, My Favourite Melodies/So Many Stars – a long-awaited venture by the pianist into the jazz genre.

References

External links
Official site
 
 

1936 births
Living people
Musicians from Riga
New Party (Latvia) politicians
People's Party (Latvia) politicians
Members of the Congress of People's Deputies of the Soviet Union
Ministers of Culture of Latvia
Deputies of the 7th Saeima
Deputies of the 8th Saeima
Deputies of the 9th Saeima
Candidates for President of Latvia
Latvian composers
Latvian pianists
Latvian classical pianists
Soviet composers
Soviet male composers
Male musical theatre composers
21st-century classical pianists
Latvian Academy of Music alumni
People's Artists of the USSR
Recipients of the Lenin Komsomol Prize
Recipients of the Cross of Recognition
Knights First Class of the Order of the Polar Star
20th-century male musicians
21st-century male musicians
Politicians from Riga